Marion is a unisex given name which may refer to:

Women
Marion Adams-Acton (1846–1928), Scottish novelist
Marion Adnams (1898–1995), English painter, printmaker, and draughtswoman
Marion Aizpors (born 1961), German swimmer
Marion Allemoz (born 1989), French ice hockey player
Marion Angus (1865–1946), Scottish poet
Marion Arnott, Scottish author
Marion Aunor (born 1992), Filipino singer-songwriter
Marion Aye (1903–1951), American actress
Marion Bailey (born 1951), British actress
Marion Bartoli (born 1984), French tennis player
Marion Bauer (1882–1955), American composer, teacher, writer, and music critic
Marion Barter (born 1945), Australian missing teacher who has not been seen since 1997
Marion Babcock Baxter (1850–1910), American lecturer, author, financial agent
Marion Howard Brazier (1850–1935), American journalist, editor, lecturer, clubwoman
Marion Corbett, pen name of the Misses Corbett
Marion Cotillard (born 1975), French actress
Marion Cunningham (author) (1922–2012), American cookbook author
Marion Davies (1897–1961), American actress and mistress of William Randolph Hearst
Marion Cameron Gray (1902–1979), Scottish mathematician
Marion Hall (born 1972), Jamaican musician
Marion Jones (born 1975), American sprinter
Marion Jones Farquhar (1879–1965), née Jones, American tennis player
Marion Kracht (born 1962), German actress 
Marion Lüttge (born 1941), former East German javelin thrower
Marion Mann (singer) (1914–2004), American singer
Marion Maréchal (born 1989), French politician
Marion Marlowe (1929–2012), American singer and actress
Marion Shilling (1910–2004), American actress 
Marion Simon Misch (1869–1941), American activist, teacher, writer and businesswoman
Marion Stokes (1929–2012), American activist and archivist
Marion Raven (born 1984), Norwegian singer and songwriter
Marion Ross (born 1928), American actress
Marion Ross (physicist) (1903–1994), Scottish physicist
Marion Tuu'luq (1910–2002), Canadian Inuk artist
Marion Tylee (1906–1969), New Zealand artist

Men
Marion Barber Jr. (born 1959), American former National Football League player
Marion Barber III (1983–2022), American former National Football League player, son of the above
Marion Barry (1936–2014), former mayor of Washington, D.C.
Marion M. Bradford (1946–2021), American scientist known for his protein quantification method
Marion Broadstone (1906–1972), American National Football League player
Marion Butts (born 1966), American National Football League player
Marion Cox (1920–1996), NASCAR car owner
Marion Knight Jr (born 1965), birth name of Suge Knight, founder of Death Row Records
Marion Mann (1920–2022), American physician and pathologist
Marion Morrison (1907–1979), birth name of John Wayne, American film actor
Marion Motley (1920–1999), American National Football League and All-America Football Conference player, member of the Pro Hall of Fame
Marion Albert Pruett (1949–1999), American spree killer
Marion Pugh (1919–1976), American National Football League player
Marion Pat Robertson (born 1930), American televangelist
Marion Mike Rounds (born 1954), U.S. Senator from (and former Governor of) South Dakota
Marion Silva Fernandes (born 1991), Brazilian footballer known simply as "Marion"
Marion Spielmann (1858–1948), English journalist and art critic

Fictional characters

Mr. Moseby, played by Phill Lewis in The Suite Life of Zack & Cody and its spin-off, The Suite Life on Deck
Marion, in the videogame Gunbird
Marion "Bill" Williamson, in the video games Red Dead Redemption and Red Dead Redemption 2
Marion Ravenwood, in the Indiana Jones franchise
Lieutenant Marion "Cobra" Cobretti, in the movie Cobra , played by Sylvester Stallone.

See also
Marian (given name), another unisex given name

Unisex given names